Carl Wilson (1946–1998) was an American singer, guitarist and composer, best known as a founding member of The Beach Boys.

Carl Wilson may also refer to:

Carl Wilson (album), 1981 self-titled album by Carl Wilson
Carl Wilson (writer), Canadian cultural critic
Carl Wilson (footballer) (born 1940), English footballer
Carl Wilson (politician), member of the Oregon House of Representatives
Carl Wilson (swimmer) (born 1967), Australian swimmer